These 169 species belong to Polycyrtus, a genus of ichneumon wasps in the family Ichneumonidae.

Polycyrtus species

 Polycyrtus accuratus (Cresson, 1874) c g
 Polycyrtus acerbus (Cresson, 1874) c g
 Polycyrtus albiniclavus Cushman, 1931 c g
 Polycyrtus albispina Szepligeti, 1916 c g
 Polycyrtus alboannulatus Szepligeti, 1916 c
 Polycyrtus albocinctus Zuniga, 2004 c g
 Polycyrtus albolineatus Cameron, 1911 c
 Polycyrtus alei Zuniga, 2004 c g
 Polycyrtus alexisi Zuniga, 2004 c g
 Polycyrtus alterator (Trentepohl, 1829) c g
 Polycyrtus amoenus (Viereck, 1913) c g
 Polycyrtus areolaris Cushman, 1931 c g
 Polycyrtus areolatus Cushman, 1931 c g
 Polycyrtus atriceps (Cresson, 1874) c
 Polycyrtus avilae Zuniga, 2004 c g
 Polycyrtus barrientosi Zuniga, 2004 c g
 Polycyrtus bicarinatus Cushman, 1931 c g
 Polycyrtus bicolor Zuniga, 2004 c g
 Polycyrtus boliviensis Cushman, 1931 c g
 Polycyrtus brevigenalis Cushman, 1931 c g
 Polycyrtus brunneator (Fabricius, 1798) c g
 Polycyrtus bulbosus Cushman, 1931 c g
 Polycyrtus burgosi Kasparyan & Ruiz-Cancino, 2003 c g
 Polycyrtus buscki Cushman, 1931 c g
 Polycyrtus calii Zuniga, 2004 c g
 Polycyrtus capitator (Fabricius, 1804) c g
 Polycyrtus carinispinis Cushman, 1931 c g
 Polycyrtus carmenae Zuniga, 2004 c g
 Polycyrtus caudatus Szepligeti, 1916 c g
 Polycyrtus cedrella (Kasparyan & Ruiz-Cancino, 2003) c g
 Polycyrtus chalmersi Zuniga, 2004 c g
 Polycyrtus chiriquensis Cameron, 1886 c g
 Polycyrtus circumfluens Cushman, 1931 c g
 Polycyrtus clausus Zuniga, 2004 c g
 Polycyrtus clavator Kasparyan & Ruiz-Cancino, 2003 c g
 Polycyrtus cockerellae Viereck, 1912 c g
 Polycyrtus comma Kasparyan & Ruiz-Cancino, 2003 c g
 Polycyrtus condylobus Zuniga, 2004 c g
 Polycyrtus confusus Cushman, 1931 c g
 Polycyrtus constricticlavus Cushman, 1931 c g
 Polycyrtus convergens Cushman, 1931 c g
 Polycyrtus copiosus (Cresson, 1874) c g
 Polycyrtus copularis Zuniga, 2004 c g
 Polycyrtus crespoi Kasparyan & Ruiz-Cancino, 2003 c g
 Polycyrtus curtispina Kasparyan & Ruiz-Cancino, 2003 c g
 Polycyrtus curvispina Cameron, 1886 c g
 Polycyrtus curviventris Cameron, 1886 c g
 Polycyrtus dahianae Zuniga, 2004 c g
 Polycyrtus delphini (Kasparyan & Ruiz-Cancino, 2003) c g
 Polycyrtus dentatorius (Fabricius, 1804) c g
 Polycyrtus donzoi Zuniga, 2004 c g
 Polycyrtus duplaris Zuniga, 2004 c g
 Polycyrtus duplicatus Cushman, 1931 c g
 Polycyrtus elegans (Provancher, 1888) c g
 Polycyrtus eliethae Zuniga, 2004 c g
 Polycyrtus elviae Zuniga, 2004 c g
 Polycyrtus emaculatus Szepligeti, 1916 c g
 Polycyrtus emarginatus (Brulle, 1846) c g
 Polycyrtus eneyae Zuniga, 2004 c g
 Polycyrtus enriquei Zuniga, 2004 c g
 Polycyrtus epimeron (Kasparyan & Ruiz-Cancino, 2003) c g
 Polycyrtus erythrosternus Cameron, 1886 c g
 Polycyrtus femoratus Spinola, 1840 c g
 Polycyrtus ferox (Cresson, 1873) c g
 Polycyrtus fonsecai Zuniga, 2004 c g
 Polycyrtus furvus (Cresson, 1874) c g
 Polycyrtus gauldi Zuniga, 2004 c g
 Polycyrtus giacomellii Schrottky, 1911 c g
 Polycyrtus gibbulus Szepligeti, 1916 c g
 Polycyrtus gynnae Zuniga, 2004 c g
 Polycyrtus hernandezi Zuniga, 2004 c g
 Polycyrtus herrerai Zuniga, 2004 c g
 Polycyrtus hidalgoi Zuniga, 2004 c g
 Polycyrtus hilaris (Kasparyan & Ruiz-Cancino, 2003) c g
 Polycyrtus histrio Spinola, 1840 c g
 Polycyrtus humerosus Cushman, 1931 c g
 Polycyrtus iconicus Zuniga, 2004 c g
 Polycyrtus impressus Cushman, 1931 c g
 Polycyrtus inca Cushman, 1931 c g
 Polycyrtus inezae Zuniga, 2004 c g
 Polycyrtus infractus Cushman, 1931 c g
 Polycyrtus inquinatus Cushman, 1931 c g
 Polycyrtus isidroi Zuniga, 2004 c g
 Polycyrtus isthmus Cushman, 1931 c g
 Polycyrtus javieri Zuniga, 2004 c g
 Polycyrtus josei Zuniga, 2004 c g
 Polycyrtus juani Zuniga, 2004 c g
 Polycyrtus juanmii Zuniga, 2004 c g
 Polycyrtus junceus (Cresson, 1874) c g
 Polycyrtus kattyae Zuniga, 2004 c g
 Polycyrtus latigulus Zuniga, 2004 c g
 Polycyrtus leprieurii Spinola, 1840 c g
 Polycyrtus leucopus (Brulle, 1846) c g
 Polycyrtus leucostomus (Taschenberg, 1876) c g
 Polycyrtus lidiae Zuniga, 2004 c g
 Polycyrtus lindhae Zuniga, 2004 c g
 Polycyrtus lituratus (Brulle, 1846) c g
 Polycyrtus lovejoyi Zuniga, 2004 c g
 Polycyrtus lucidator Erichson, 1848 c g
 Polycyrtus luisi Zuniga, 2004 c g
 Polycyrtus macer (Cresson, 1874) c
 Polycyrtus maculatus Zuniga, 2004 c g
 Polycyrtus major (Cresson, 1874) c g
 Polycyrtus mancus (Cresson, 1874) c g
 Polycyrtus manni Cushman, 1931 c g
 Polycyrtus marcoi Zuniga, 2004 c g
 Polycyrtus martini Zuniga, 2004 c g
 Polycyrtus medialbus Cushman, 1931 c g
 Polycyrtus mediotinctus Cushman, 1931 c g
 Polycyrtus melanocephalus Cameron, 1911 c g
 Polycyrtus melanoleucus (Brulle, 1846) c g
 Polycyrtus minutus Cushman, 1931 c g
 Polycyrtus nanii Zuniga, 2004 c g
 Polycyrtus neglectus Cushman, 1926 c g b
 Polycyrtus nigriceps (Brulle, 1846) c
 Polycyrtus nigriclypeatus Cushman, 1931 c g
 Polycyrtus nigroscutellatus (Brulle, 1846) c g
 Polycyrtus nigrotibialis Szepligeti, 1916 c g
 Polycyrtus nudus Szepligeti, 1916 c g
 Polycyrtus obtusispina Cameron, 1885 c g
 Polycyrtus ornatifrons Cushman, 1931 c g
 Polycyrtus pallidibalteatus Cameron, 1885 c g
 Polycyrtus pallidus (Cresson, 1874) c g
 Polycyrtus paranensis Cushman, 1931 c g
 Polycyrtus parmenioi Zuniga, 2004 c g
 Polycyrtus parviclavus Cushman, 1931 c g
 Polycyrtus patriciae Zuniga, 2004 c g
 Polycyrtus paululus (Cresson, 1874) c g
 Polycyrtus perditor (Fabricius, 1804) c g
 Polycyrtus prominens Cushman, 1931 c g
 Polycyrtus proximannulatus Cushman, 1931 c g
 Polycyrtus quadrisulcatus Spinola, 1840 c g
 Polycyrtus raveni Zuniga, 2004 c g
 Polycyrtus rebecae Zuniga, 2004 c g
 Polycyrtus retusus Zuniga, 2004 c g
 Polycyrtus riojanus Brèthes, 1916 c g
 Polycyrtus rufiventris Spinola, 1840 c g
 Polycyrtus rugulosus Szepligeti, 1916 c g
 Polycyrtus sartor (Fabricius, 1804) c g
 Polycyrtus semialbus (Cresson, 1865) c g
 Polycyrtus semirufus Szepligeti, 1916 c
 Polycyrtus sigillatus Zuniga, 2004 c g
 Polycyrtus similis Szepligeti, 1916 c
 Polycyrtus solisi Zuniga, 2004 c g
 Polycyrtus soniae Kasparyan & Ruiz-Cancino, 2003 c g
 Polycyrtus spinatorius (Fabricius, 1804) c g
 Polycyrtus subtenuis (Cresson, 1865) c
 Polycyrtus superbus (Provancher, 1888) c g
 Polycyrtus surinamensis Szepligeti, 1916 c
 Polycyrtus suturalis (Brulle, 1846) c g
 Polycyrtus testaceus (Taschenberg, 1876) c
 Polycyrtus texanus (Porter, 1977) c g
 Polycyrtus thoracicus Tzankov & Alayo, 1974 c g
 Polycyrtus tigrinus Zuniga, 2004 c g
 Polycyrtus tinctipennis Cameron, 1886 c g
 Polycyrtus triangularis Cushman, 1931 c g
 Polycyrtus trichromus (Spinola, 1851) c g
 Polycyrtus tricolor (Brulle, 1846) c
 Polycyrtus trilineatus (Brulle, 1846) c
 Polycyrtus trochanteratus Szepligeti, 1916 c
 Polycyrtus tuberculatus (Brulle, 1846) c g
 Polycyrtus tubulifer (Viereck, 1913) c g
 Polycyrtus univittatus (Cresson, 1874) c g
 Polycyrtus vierecki Townes, 1966 c g
 Polycyrtus wilsoni Zuniga, 2004 c g
 Polycyrtus xanthocarpus Szepligeti, 1916 c
 Polycyrtus xanthopus (Brulle, 1846) c
 Polycyrtus xantothorax (Brulle, 1846) c g
 Polycyrtus yucatan Kasparyan & Ruiz-Cancino, 2003 c g

Data sources: i = ITIS, c = Catalogue of Life, g = GBIF, b = Bugguide.net

References

Polycyrtus